Arvale may refer to:

Carmen Arvale, a chant of the Arval priests of ancient Rome
Rose Arvale, a character in American TV series The Messengers